Lucan is a town in Ireland, located 12 km west of Dublin city centre on the River Liffey. It is near the Strawberry Beds and Lucan Weir, and at the confluence of the River Griffeen. It is mostly under the jurisdiction of South Dublin County Council with the exception of the North Lucan areas of Laraghcon, Coldblow and Saint Catherine's Park which are in the jurisdiction of Fingal County Council. Road access to Lucan is from the N4, and the M50 motorway at Junction 7.

Etymology
In the Irish language, 'leamhachán' refers to the marsh-mallow plant, used up to modern times in folk medicine (for sprains and chest infections) and sweet manufacture, and so the name could be rendered as "place of marsh-mallow plants" or "land abounding in marsh-mallows."  The plant grows in the Liffey Valley and surrounds, as recorded in the 1837 Ainmleabhar Paróiste, reported by Jackson (1914). In 1615, the area was described as 'a marshy place'.,. 
The alternative meaning is derived from the Irish for elm, leamhán, and has been more popularised, although both definitions could be equally valid, with both mallows and elms still growing in the Lucan area, and etymological experts unable to definitively choose one meaning over the other, as is evidenced on logainm.ie.

History

Early history
There is evidence of prehistoric settlement in Lucan as the features that attracted early people such as river access, fishing, well-drained soil and hunting were all around. There is significant prehistoric activity in the Cooldrinagh townland of Lucan, with early Mesolithic flints found in significant quantities, as well as the remains of two small kerbed passage tombs. In the area around Vesey Park, there are remains of a hillfort (Knockanardousk "hill of the high water") that may have been the house and enclosure of an early lord of Lucan in medieval times. This enclosure also contained a souterrain, excavated in the 18th century by George Petrie and of which, some of the finds are in the National Museum of Ireland. Another notable archaeological site is St Finian's Esker church and graveyard, which is listed by both the National Monuments Service and the National Inventory of Architectural Heritage. There are two other medieval churches in Lucan also; the Church of the Blessed Virgin, Lucan village (an enclosed gated graveyard & medieval church site with attached chantry or tower house, and the medieval parish church of Aderrig, Lucan, off Tubber Lane.

Sarsfields and Veseys
When Oliver Cromwell came to Ireland, Lucan was a village of 120 inhabitants.

In 1566, Sir William Sarsfield acquired Lucan Manor, and the property became closely associated with the Sarsfield family. Patrick Sarsfield, the Irish Jacobite leader, was born in the castle that had occupied the manor grounds and was granted the title Earl of Lucan by King James II.

Lucan House was built on the site of Sarsfield's castle in 1772, by the Rt Hon. Agmondisham Vesey, who was descended from the Sarsfield family. The circular ground floor dining room is said to have been an inspiration for the Oval Office of the White House. The decorative plasterwork was carried out by Michael Stapleton. Over the years, the house passed out of the Vesey family and, since 1942, has been the residence of the Italian ambassador to Ireland. On the grounds of the house is the spa, the waters of which attracted people to the town in previous times.

The influence of the Sarsfield and Vesey families on Lucan is still apparent in the area. For example, the local Gaelic Athletic Association club is Lucan Sarsfields and a pub in the village bears the name 'The Vesey Arms'.

Developments

The discovery of a sulphurous spa in Lucan in 1758 brought the district into prominence, and it became a destination for weekend parties from Dublin and the surrounding countryside. Much development followed in the vicinity, and by 1795 a ballroom and a later hotel had been erected.  Many of the structures in Lucan village were constructed as part of a large redevelopment around 1815. Later, Lucan was a terminus on the combination of tram lines serving Lucan and Leixlip from Dublin city centre.

Transport and access
Lucan village is located north of the N4/M4 national primary route to the west and northwest of Ireland. An outer-orbital distributor called the Outer Ring Road, designated as R136, from the N4 (Woodies) interchange to the N81 Tallaght Bypass, was completed in 2008.

Lucan is located between two major national/commuter railway lines. The original Lucan North (Leixlip) Station on the north/northwest line, and Lucan South station on the south/southwest line, were closed in 1941 and 1947, respectively. The greenfield development of the Lucan townlands as a major residential area was predicated on the prime location between the motorways and railways. Adamstown railway station re-opened in 2007 to serve the area; it is located south of Finnstown, Lucan. This station will also service significant further developments planned to the south of Adamstown townlands and the south/southwest commuter line.

In 2018 it was announced that the Luas is planned to be extended to Lucan under the government's Project Ireland 2040 transport plan.

Dublin Bus provides several bus services to the area. Feeder routes, such as the L52, run through Lucan from Adamstown to Blanchardstown. Some independent bus operators also serve Lucan.

Weston Airport is located to the west of Lucan near the Dublin/Kildare border. This facility conducts pilot training and serves privately owned light aircraft and helicopters. Its new terminal is located south of the M4 to the east of the Dublin Celbridge Road and Kildare border.

Features

King John's Bridge
King John's Bridge in Griffeen Park is reputed to be the oldest surviving bridge in Ireland, having apparently been constructed sometime during the reign of John, King of England from 1199 to 1216. Originally composed of three arches, only one arch survives today - and it is in a ruinous state. The bridge is situated in quiet parkland and crosses the narrow Griffeen River; it is sited close to the ruins of Old Esker Church. Postcards were printed of the bridge in the 1930s such was its notability. South Dublin County Council have proposed €20,000 be made available to carry out conservation work on the bridge to make it a more prominent historical landmark.

Lucan House
Lucan House is a seven-bay two-storey over basement Palladian country villa. Agmonisham Vesey cleared the previous residence and began construction in 1772. The architecture is the work of Vesey and William Chambers, with Michael Stapleton responsible for the plasterwork. The estate passed through the Sarsfield, Vesey and Colthurst families through marriage and also was once the residence of Charles Hugh O'Conor, the third son of Charles Owen O'Conor and then, in 1954, it was purchased by the Italian Government for use as the residence of the Italian Ambassador to Ireland. The remainder of the estate land is now Liffey Valley Park.

Others
Another notable feature is St Finian's medieval church and graveyard at Esker.

Amenities
The Griffeen Valley Park runs along the Griffeen River, with some smaller outlying park areas among housing developments to the west. The main area of the park is split by the Lucan Bypass, with Vesey Park on one side and Griffeen Park on the other. A feature of the park is the old woodland in Vesey Park that was retained when the park was formed. This woodland is most extensive along the Griffeen River and contains mature deciduous and coniferous trees. The most important area on the river is the wet woodland containing the most extensive fern and bryophyte growth recorded in the five parks surveyed. The woodland also provides the habitat for the protected species Hypericum hirsutum.

Lucan Library is a part of a network of libraries in South Dublin.

Education

Lucan has a number of schools. St. Mary's Boys National School (BNS) is the oldest school which dates back to 1833. Other schools include St. Mary's Girls Primary School, St. Joseph's Girls Secondary School, Kishoge Community College (mixed), Griffeen Community College (mixed), Coláiste Phádraig (a Christian Brothers secondary school), St. Andrew's (mixed) National School, Lucan Community College, Esker Educate Together primary school, Scoil Áine and St. Thomas's primary schools (Esker, mixed VEC school), Divine Mercy National School (mixed primary), Scoil Mhuire (mixed primary) Adamstown Castle Educate Together, St John The Evangelist primary schools and Adamstown Community College There are two Irish-speaking primary schools, Gaelscoil Eiscir Riada and Gaelscoil Naomh Pádraig (mixed), and an Irish-speaking secondary school, Coláiste Cois Life.

Media
Lucan has a free magazine, The Link, that contains items of local interest. It is distributed to 15,000 homes and 1,000 copies are distributed to local businesses. The Lucan Newsletter, a venue for local organizations to report on activities and meetings, was first published in 1967 and is produced and published weekly by volunteers. Local newspapers include the Liffey Champion which is a weekly newspaper for the Lucan area of South Dublin and North Kildare, The Echo which is published in Lucan as the Lucan Echo, and the Lucan Gazette. Lucan Life started in March 2014 and is the main Lucan Facebook page with followers sharing photos, news and events in Lucan.

Liffey Sound Communications Co-operative Society Limited, a not-for-profit organisation, runs Liffey Sound FM, the local community radio station. Liffey Sound FM is another local media source run entirely by volunteers. The station has been broadcasting since July 2006.

Economy
In terms of retail, the main street contains the newsagent Centra, bookmakers, boutiques, banks, charity shops, IT shops and cafés. The Lucan Shopping Centre includes SuperValu, Dunnes Store, Peter Mark, and McDonald's, along with a Community Library.

The area is primarily a residential one, but employers in the area include the Liffey Valley Shopping Centre, Citywest and Tallaght in southwest Dublin, Intel in Leixlip, Co. Kildare, and eBay's European operation in Blanchardstown.

Local organisations and charities

Pieta House 

Pieta House is a charity, set up by psychologist Joan Freeman, to provide assistance to people experiencing depression and suicidal thoughts. Its main location is in Lucan centre. As of 2015, the combined Pieta House locations were working with more than 5000 people per year.

Lucan Disability Action Group (LDAG) 
Lucan Disability Action Group was established in October 2000, to address the needs of people with disabilities in the Lucan area.

Sport

GAA
Lucan has three GAA teams. Lucan Sarsfields, the largest sports organisation in the town, was founded in 1886 and is located on the 12th Lock on the Grand Canal. Lucan Sarsfields won the u/21 Dublin Football Championship and a Minor double of Football and Hurling in 2005. Lucan Sarsfields U21 B team won the Callum Sally Cup in 2005 and again in 2009. The Dublin Hurling captain, Johnny McCaffrey, plays for Sarsfields. Westmanstown Gaels are also located in north Lucan at the Westmanstown Sports Centre, which has diversified from its roots as a leisure centre for the Garda Síochána.

An Irish-language GAA club, Na Gaeil Óga CLG, started their juvenile structure in the area in September 2014, and is currently based in Gaelscoileanna and a Gaelcholáiste in the area, Gaelscoil Naomh Pádraig, Gaelscoil Eiscir Riada and Coláiste Cois Life. The majority of their adult teams play in St Catherine's Park.

Football
Several football teams play in the area: Arthur Griffith Park FC, Griffeen Celtic, Beech Park, Esker Celtic, Ballyowen Celtic, Hillcrest AFC, Lucan United FC, and Liffey Valley Rangers FC.

Boxing
Esker Amateur Boxing Club has hosted the first ever All-Female Amateur Boxing tournament in Ireland. It has grown to become the World's largest female-only boxing tournament in 2019 with 19 countries spread over three continents attending. Esker Boxing Club has been running a long campaign to build its own permanent clubhouse.

In January 2008, Lucan Boxing Club reformed after a few years of hiatus.

Golf

The two main golf courses in Lucan are Lucan Golf Club and Hermitage Golf Club. Both courses are member-run and date back over a hundred years.

Liffey Valley Par 3 is a par 3 golf course that is situated between Leixlip and Lucan.

Basketball
Liffey Celtics Basketball Club is a basketball club for girls aged from 7 up to senior, and boys aged 7 to senior. There are 13 (9 girls & 10 boys) underage basketball teams competing in the Dublin Area Board League and Cup competitions. Training and home matches take place at the Colaiste Cois Life (Lucan), Leixlip Amenities Centre, and Confey GAA (Leixlip). The club has a senior women's team competing in the Basketball Ireland Super League.

Other sports
Lucan Tae Kwon-Do school has been in the area since 1992.

A skatepark was opened in 2007 in Griffeen Valley Park.

The Dublin Dragons American Football Team were also based in Lucan but moved to Tymon Park and rebranded as the South Dublin Panthers.

Awards 
In September 2013, Lucan Village claimed the South Dublin title in the Tidy Towns competition.

People
Former or current residents of the town have included:
 Aaron Callaghan (born 1966) – Football Manager
 Tommy Carr (born 1961) – Former Dublin GAA inter-county Footballer and Manager
 Jake Carroll (born 1991) – Professional Footballer
 Joanne Doyle (born 1973) – Irish dancer with Riverdance
 Joan Freeman (born 1958) – Founder of Pieta House
 James Gandon (1743-1823) – Architect 
 Paul Gogarty (born 1968) – Politician, South Dublin County Councillor for Lucan Local Electoral Area (LEA)
 John and Edward Grimes, known professionally as Jedward (born 1991) – singing duo
 James Alexander Hamilton Irwin (1876-1954) – Presbyterian minister and a supporter of Irish unity and independence.
 Derek Keating (born 1955) - Politician
 Liam Lawlor (1945-2005) – Politician
 John McCaffrey (born 1987) – Current Dublin GAA inter-county Hurling Captain
 Derek McGrath (born 1972) – Professional Footballer
 Laura Nolan (born 1994) - Choreographer
 Patrick Sarsfield (1655-1693) – Lucan born Jacobite and Leader in the Irish Army. Earl of Lucan
 Jack Sheedy – Former Dublin GAA inter-county Footballer and All Ireland Winner
 Joanna Tuffy (born 1965) - Politician

References

External links
 South Dublin County History
 South Dublin County Images

Towns and villages in South Dublin (county)
Civil parishes of Newcastle, County Dublin